The International Association for Dental Research (IADR) is a professional association, founded in 1920 by William Gies, that focuses on research in the field of dentistry. The aim of this association by constitution is to promote research in all fields of oral and related sciences, to encourage improvements in methods for the prevention and treatment of oral and dental disease, to improve the oral health of the public through research, and to facilitate cooperation among investigators and the communication of research findings and their implications throughout the world. The Journal of Dental Research (JDR) is the official medical journal of the IADR and the American Association for Dental Research.

See also
 Prague Section of IADR

References

External links
IADR official website
Journal of Dental Research

Dental organizations